Sacajawea State Park is a public recreation area and historical preserve in the city of Pasco, Washington, covering  at the confluence of the Snake and Columbia rivers where the Lewis and Clark Expedition camped on October 16, 1805. The state park bears the name of the Shoshone woman Sacagawea, who was an active member of the expedition married to expedition member Toussaint Charbonneau, a French-Canadian interpreter and explorer. The park's Sacajawea Interpretive Center features exhibits about her and about the Lewis and Clark Expedition.

Park history
The park originated as a single-acre plot donated in 1927 and nurtured by members of the Pasco chapter of the Daughters of the Pioneers of Washington, preserving the Lewis and Clark encampment site. The grounds became a state park in 1931. Workers with the WPA constructed the park museum and three other buildings in 1938.

Activities and amenities
The park has facilities for picnicking, hiking, boating, fishing, and swimming. It is the beginning of the Sacagawea Heritage Trail, a paved bike trail that connects the communities of Tri-Cities area. The park's single campsite is held in reserve for paddlers on the Northwest Discovery Water Trail.

References

External links

Sacajawea Historical State Park Washington State Parks and Recreation Commission 
Sacajawea State Park Map Washington State Parks and Recreation Commission 
Sacajawea State Park U.S. Army Corps of Engineers

Parks in Franklin County, Washington
State parks of Washington (state)
Museums in Franklin County, Washington
1931 establishments in Washington (state)
Works Progress Administration in Washington (state)
Sacagawea